Melisa Rincón (born ) known professionally as Bunny Michael, is an American interdisciplinary visual artist, musician, and rapper.

Early life and education 
Bunny Michael was raised in Dallas, Texas. They are the middle of three children born to a second-generation Mexican American father and a Samoan mother. They were raised in an affluent suburb. Michael attended Booker T. Washington High School for the Performing and Visual Arts. They realized they were queer at the age of fifteen and stated that coming out to their family was a difficult process. Michael briefly moved in with their first girlfriend's family. They have since reconciled with their family. Michael graduated from Marymount Manhattan College.

Career 
Michael is a visual artist, musician, and rapper whose work often examines the relationship between the masculine and feminine, the body and the soul, and the self and higher self. After graduating from college, they shared their music through Myspace. Michael was the vocalist performing by the name Bunny Rabbit with producer Black Cracker. It is described by HuffPost as an "eponymous experimental rap collaboration." Bunny Rabbit toured with CocoRosie and gained praise from New Yorker critic Sasha Frere-Jones who stated in 2007, "I am fond of the deeply odd, occasionally obscene art rap of Bunny Rabbit."

Michael garnered a large fan base through Myspace which allowed them to book their own U.S. tour.

Michael was working as a waiter in 2017. In 2018, Michael went on tour in Europe with Fever Ray.

They are known for their "Me and My Higher Self" memes on Instagram which started when Michael was undergoing a major spiritual transformation of their own. This project is aimed at increasing self-love, and much like Michael's music and visual art, also explores the multiplicities within the self. Remezcla reports that Michael is a "queer multimedia artist...[who] utilizes music, art videos, and memes as their mediums to explore themes of self love and acceptance, spirituality, and sexuality in a time when our 'deepest truths are being revealed'."

Michael is the host of “Broadly Hotline,” a web series on Broadly.

Michael is currently working on starting a podcast centered around self-care, personal growth, and other millennial-related topics.

Michael appeared in two seasons of the HBO series High Maintenance.

Influences 
Two years into their music career, Michael was influenced by the book A New Earth. They are a student of A Course in Miracles.

Personal life 
Michael moved to New York City one week before the September 11 attacks in 2001. Michael is non-binary and now lives in The Hudson Valley with spouse, Khara Gilvey and a cat named Pepper.

See also 

 LGBT culture in Dallas–Fort Worth
 LGBT culture in New York City

References

External links
 
 

Living people
1980s births
Year of birth uncertain
Non-binary musicians
American LGBT artists
American LGBT musicians
20th-century American rappers
21st-century American rappers
Rappers from Dallas
Rappers from Brooklyn
LGBT people from Texas
American people of Samoan descent
American rappers of Mexican descent
American artists of Mexican descent
LGBT Hispanic and Latino American people
Marymount Manhattan College alumni
20th-century American artists
21st-century American artists
21st-century LGBT people